Aoibhín Garrihy, Ailbhe Garrihy and Doireann Garrihy are Irish social media influencers, having played different roles in the entertainment industry. Aoibhín is an actress, having played Neasa Dillon in RTÉ One's Fair City from 2010 to 2013. She came second in the first series of the Irish version of Dancing with the Stars. Ailbhe is a publicist. Doireann is a comedy impressionist, known for two series of The Doireann Project, and radio and television presenter, hosting the revival in 2018 of RTÉ Two's The Podge and Rodge Show.

Early life
The Garrihys came from Castleknock, County Dublin, the daughters of Eugene and Clare. Eugene is now an entrepreneur, the director of ferry companies, Dublin Bay Cruises and Doolin2Aran.

Aoibhín
Aoibhín (born 20 June 1987) has acting credits including Fair City, Love/Hate, and Mattie.

In 2017, Garrihy was a contestant in the first series of RTÉ's Dancing with the Stars. On 26 March 2017, she reached the final of the competition with her professional partner, Vitali Kozmin. They finished as runners-up to Aidan O'Mahony and Kozmin's wife, Valeria Milova.

In 2018, she was a guest chef on TV3's The Restaurant.

She lives in Co. Clare with husband, John Burke, and their three children.

Ailbhe
Ailbhe (born 19 April 1990) is a graduate of Dublin City University. She now works for the family business, Dublin Bay Cruises.

Doireann
Doireann (born 19 May 1992) is the god daughter of radio presenter Ian Dempsey. Doireann graduated from Trinity College Dublin with a degree in Drama and Theatre studies. She worked as an entertainment reporter on Spin 1038 and provided traffic reports for 2fm with AA Roadwatch. Having amassed a following on social media she was commissioned by RTÉ to make a web series, The Doireann Project, based on her impressions. She has won awards such as 'Most Stylish Influencer' at the VIP Style Awards and U magazine's 30 under 30 'Rising Star'. She began presenting The Podge and Rodge Show in 2018 until 2019.

In June 2019, Doireann presented the new breakfast show on RTÉ 2fm from 6am to 9am alongside Eoghan McDermott. She has presented the show with Carl Mullan and Donncha O'Callaghan since 2021.

In October 2022, Doireann was announced as the new co-host of Dancing with the Stars alongside Jennifer Zamparelli.

References

Irish Internet celebrities
People from Castleknock
Sisters
Social media influencers